Kirill Mikhailovich Podpruzhnikov (born 31 January 1984) is a former Russian professional football player.

Club career
He made his Russian Football National League debut for FC Petrotrest St. Petersburg on 26 May 2005 in a game against FC Lokomotiv Chita.

External links
 

1984 births
Footballers from Saint Petersburg
Living people
Russian footballers
Association football defenders
FC Zenit Saint Petersburg players
FC Zenit-2 Saint Petersburg players
FC Petrotrest players
FC Dynamo Saint Petersburg players
FC Dynamo Bryansk players
FC Volyn Lutsk players
Russian expatriate footballers
Expatriate footballers in Ukraine
FC Novokuznetsk players